Nymphicula lactealis is a moth in the family Crambidae. It was described by David John Lawrence Agassiz in 2014. It is found in New Caledonia east of Australia.

The wingspan is 13–14 mm. The base of the forewings is white with a dark brown subbasal fascia and a white antemedian fascia. The median area is scaled with dark brown. The basal area of the hindwings is white with a dark brown spot. The antemedian fascia is brown.

Etymology
The species name refers to the milky coloration of the subterminal area of the hindwings.

References

Nymphicula
Moths described in 2014